

Events 
Luigi Boccherini goes to Madrid as the court chamber music composer to the Infante Don Luis.
Wenzel Pichl becomes musical director for Count Ludwig Hartig in Prague
Charles Burney receives an honorary doctorate in music from the University of Oxford.
Antonio Maria Gaspare Sacchini arrives in Venice.
James Hook is appointed composer to Marylebone Gardens.
December – 13-year-old Mozart embarks on a tour of Italy with his father, beginning in Verona. In Rome he hears Allegri's Miserere for the first time, returns home and copies it down note for note.

Opera 
Jean-François Cailhava – Les Etrenes de l'amour
Christoph Willibald von Gluck – Le feste d'Apollo
André Grétry 
Lucile
Le tableau parlant
Pierre-Alexandre Monsigny – Le déserteur
Wolfgang Amadeus Mozart – La finta semplice
Josef Mysliveček – Demofoonte
Giovanni Paisiello 
L’arabo cortese, R.1.22
Don Chisciotte della Mancia, R.1.21
Niccolò Piccinni – Lo sposo burlato

Classical music 
Carl Friedrich Abel – 6 String Quartets, Op. 8
Johann Albrechtsberger – Concerto for Alto Trombone and Orchestra in B-flat major
Charles Avison – Six Concertos in Seven Parts, for Four Violins, One Alto Viola, a Violoncello, and a Thorough Bass for the Harpsichord, Op. 10 (London: R. Bremner)
Carl Philipp Emmanuel Bach 
Die Israeliten in der Wüste (oratorio), H.775
Harpsichord Concerto in E-flat major, H.469
Luigi Boccherini 
6 Violin Sonatas, G. 25–30
6 String Quartets, G. 165–170
 João de Sousa Carvalho – L'Amore Industrioso
François Joseph Gossec – Sei quartetti per flauto e violino o sia per due violini, alto e basso, op. 14
Joseph Haydn 
String Quartets, Op. 9
Violin Concerto in G major, Hob. VIIa:4
Piano Trio in F major, Hob.XV:2
Ignaz Holzbauer – 3 Symphonies, Op. 4
Johann Philipp Kirnberger – Vermischte Musikalien (Berlin: Georg Ludewig Winter)
Wolfgang Amadeus Mozart 
Cassation in D major, K. 100/62a
Te Deum in C
 Pasquale Pericoli – 6 Cello Sonatas
Johann Heinrich Rolle – Der Tod Abels (oratorio)
Johann Baptist Wanhal 
Symphony in A minor, Bryan a2
Quartet for Strings in B-flat major, Op. 2, No. 3

Methods and theory writings 

 François-Joseph Lécuyer – Principes de l'art du chant

Births 
January 2 
Thomas Haigh, arranger and musician (died 1808)
Nannette Streicher, German piano maker, composer, music educator and writer (died 1833) 
 January 9 – William Robert Spencer, librettist and poet (died 1834)
 February 12 – Friedrich Rochlitz, music editor and writer (died 1842)
 February 13 – Ivan Krylov, librettist and writer (died 1844)
February 17 – Johannes Baptista von Albertini, librettist and botanist (died 1831)
March 7 – Josef Alois Ladurner,  Austrian composer and music educator (died 1851)
March 8 – Katerina Veronika Anna Dusíkova, Bohemian singer, harpist, pianist and composer (died 1833)
March 25 – Salvatore Viganò, choreographer, dancer and composer (died 1821)
March 28 – Schack von Staffeldt, librettist and poet (died 1826)
April 11 – Johann Georg Lickl, organist and composer (died 1843)
April 25 – Charles Borremans, violinist and conductor (died 1827)
June 1 – Józef Elsner, composer and music teacher, Chopin's future teacher (died 1854)
June 5 – Marianne Kirchgessner, German musician (d. 1808) 
June 14 – Domenico Della-Maria Italian and French composer (died 1800)
July 4 – Louis-Luc Loiseau de Persuis, violinist, conductor and composer (died 1819)
July 23 – Alexey Nikolayevich Titov, violinist and composer (died 1827)
July 29 – Louis-Benoît Picard, librettist and writer (died 1769)
August 14 
Richard Barry, composer and English rake (died 1793)
Friedrich Dülon, flautist (died 1826)
August 30 – Bonifazio Asioli, Italian composer (died 1832)
September 8 – Marie-Martin Marcel Marin, composer (died c. 1850)
September 12 – Reginald Spofforth, organist, conductor and composer (died 1827) 
November 12 – Amelia Opie, librettist and author
December 26 – Ernst Moritz Arndt, librettist and antisemitic author (died 1860)
Date unknown –
Jean-Jacques Grasset, composer and violinist (died 1839)
Charles Hague, composer (died 1821)   
Daniil Kashin, Russian composer (Died 1841)

Deaths 
January 2 – James Oswald, composer, 57
February 21 – William Falconer, librettist and writer (born 1732)
April 3 – Gerhard Tersteegen, librettist and theologian (born 1697) 
June 7 – Antoine Alexandre Henri Poinsinet, French librettist (born 1735)
August 17 – Vasily Trediakovsky, librettist and poet
September – Henri Hemsch, harpsichord maker, 69
December 6 – William Felton, composer, 56
December 13 – Christian Fürchtegott Gellert, librettist and poet (born 1715) 
date unknown – Antonio Palomba, Italian opera librettist, poet, harpsichordist, and music educator, 63

References 

 
18th century in music
Music by year